Edward Henry Peple (August 10, 1869 – July 28, 1924) was an American playwright known for his comedies and farces. He was perhaps best remembered for the plays The Prince Chap, The Littlest Rebel and A Pair of Sixes.

Biography
Born in Richmond, Virginia, Peple was educated John S. McGuire's academy in Richmond. He trained and worked as lawyer, mainly with the American Bridge Company until 1912. In 1895, he moved to New Jersey. His first play was A Broken Rose. His play The Prince Chain opened in 1895 and ran for two seasons with Cyril Scott playing the lead.<ref name= "NYT">Edward H. Peple Dead. New York Times", July 29, 1924, p. 15</ref>

Peple died on the morning of July 28, 1924, at his residence in the Hotel Royalton after suffering a heart attack the evening before.

Works
PlaysA Broken RosaryThe Prince Chap, New York : S. French 1904The Love RouteThe Silver GirlSemiramis, 1907The Littlest Rebel New York : S. French 1911A Pair of Sixes, 1914

BooksA Night Out, 1909The Littlest Rebel '' New York, Moffat, Yard 1911

References

External links

 
 
 
 
 

1869 births
1924 deaths
American dramatists and playwrights